Blue Light, Red Light, a big band album by American artist Harry Connick Jr., released in 1991. The multi-platinum album features Connick's vocals and piano, accompanied by his 14-piece big band.

Connick wrote the music, with Ramsey McLean writing most of the lyrics, (except for track #4 "Jill", #5 "He Is They Are", #10 "She Belongs To Me", and #12 "Just Kiss Me", with both music and lyrics by Harry Connick Jr.).

Track listing
"Blue Light, Red Light (Someone's There)" (Harry Connick Jr, Ramsey McLean) – 3:31
"A Blessing And A Curse" (Connick, McLean) – 3:06
"You Didn't Know Me When" (Connick, McLean) – 3:13
"Jill" (Connick) – 6:13 
"He Is They Are" (Connick) – 4:15
"With Imagination (I'll Get There)" (Connick, McLean) – 5:01
"If I Could Give You More" (Connick, McLean) – 4:49
"The Last Payday"  (Connick, McLean) – 7:16
"It's Time"  (Connick, McLean) – 6:38
"She Belongs To Me" (Connick) – 3:57
"Sonny Cried" (Connick, McLean) – 5:46
"Just Kiss Me"  (Connick) – 4:53

Promo Track listing
"blue light, red light - 3:30
"sonny cried - 5:44

Musicians
Harry Connick Jr. - Piano, vocals 
Brad Leali - Alto Sax 
Will Campbell - Alto Sax 
Jerry Weldon - Tenor Sax 
Ned Goold - Tenor Sax 
David Schumacher - Bari Sax, Bass Clarinet, Flute 
Louis Ford - Clarinet 
Mark Mullins - Trombone 
Craig Klein - Trombone 
Lucien Barbarin - Trombone, Sousaphone 
Joe Barati - Bass Trombone 
Roger Ingram - Trumpet 
Dan Miller - Trumpet 
Leroy Jones - Trumpet 
Jeremy Davenport - Trumpet 
Russell Malone - Guitar 
Benjamin Jonah Wolfe - Bass 
Shannon Powell - drums
Tracey Freeman - Producer
Gregg Rubin - Engineer/ Mixer

Billboard Album Chart
1991 Blue Light, Red Light debuted at No. 1 on the jazz chart 
1992 Blue Light, Red Light had its peak position at The Billboard 200 as No. 17 on February 29.

Awards and nominations
1992 Grammy Award nomination: Best Traditional Pop Performance -- Blue Light, Red Light
1992 Grammy Award nomination: Best Instrumental Arrangement w/ Vocals -- "Blue Light, Red Light (Someone's There)"
1992 Soul Train Music Award nomination: Best Jazz Album

Certifications

References

External links
"You Didn't Know Me When", Music video at aol.com

1991 albums
Harry Connick Jr. albums
Columbia Records albums